Koptevo is a station on the Moscow Central Circle of the Moscow Metro that opened in November 2016.

The station is named for the Koptevo District of Moscow where it is situated.

References

External links 

 Коптево mkzd.ru

Moscow Metro stations
Railway stations in Russia opened in 2016
Moscow Central Circle stations